R398 road may refer to:
 R398 road (Ireland)
 R398 road (South Africa)